Germany competed at the 2012 Winter Youth Olympics in Innsbruck, Austria. The German team consisted of 57 athletes competing in 15 different sports.

Medalists

Alpine skiing

Boys

Girls

Team

Biathlon

Boys

Girls

Mixed

Bobsleigh

Boys

Cross country skiing

Boys

Girls

Sprint

Mixed

Curling

Boys
Skip: Daniel Rothballer
Second: Kevin Lehmann

Girls
Third: Frederike Manner
Lead: Nicole Muskatewitz

Mixed Team

Round-robin results

Draw 1

Draw 2

Draw 3

Draw 4

Draw 5

Draw 6

Draw 7

Mixed doubles

Round of 32

Round of 16

Quarterfinals

Semifinals

Gold Medal Game

Figure skating

Boys

Freestyle skiing

Ski Cross

Ski Half-Pipe

Ice hockey

Girls

Anna Fiegert
Theresa Fritz
Lucie Geelhaar
Melanie Häringer
Simone Hase
Theresia Hoppe
Viola Hotter
Nina Korff
Meike Krimphove
Katharina Oertel
Valerie Offermann
Maylina Schrul
Saskia Selzer
Pia Szawlowski
Lena Walz
Carolin Welsch
Johanna Winter

Group A

Semifinals

Bronze medal game

Final rank:

Luge

Boys

Girls

Team

Nordic combined

Boys

Short track speed skating

Girls

Mixed

Skeleton

Boys

Girls

Ski jumping

Boys

Girls

Team w/Nordic Combined

Snowboarding

Boys

Speed skating

Boys

Girls

See also
Germany at the 2012 Summer Olympics

References

Winter Youth Olympics
Nations at the 2012 Winter Youth Olympics
Youth